Daynason Browne (born 6 May 1986) is a Nevisian cricketer. He played in three Twenty20 matches for the Nevis Cricket Team in 2006 and 2008, and in one first-class match for the Leeward Islands in 2010.

See also
 List of Nevis Twenty20 cricketers
 List of Leeward Islands first-class cricketers

References

External links
 

1986 births
Living people
Nevisian cricketers
Leeward Islands cricketers